Kelly Kelekidou is the debut album of popular Greek singer, Kelly Kelekidou. It was released in Greece in December 2005 by Sony BMG Greece.

Track listing
 "Glyka Glyka Glykia Mou" - 4:04
 "Ma To Theo" - 3:30
 "Kratise Me Dinata" - 3:11
 "Mi Mou Milas" - 4:53
 "Mou Rihnis Tin Efthini" - 3:14
 "Thlimmeno Koritsaki" - 3:18
 "Lathos Andras" - 3:11
 "Pia Itan Toso Diki Sou" - 4:22
 "Zo Gia Mena" - 3:17
 "Etsi" - 3:34
 "Signomi" - 3:40
 "Ena Dakri" - 3:54

References

2005 debut albums
Greek-language albums
Kelly Kelekidou albums
Sony Music Greece albums